Vadim Ivanov may refer to: 

Vadim Ivanov (footballer) (1943–96), Soviet Russian footballer and manager
Vadim Ivanov (figure skater) (born 1994), Russian figure skater
Vadim Ivanov (long jumper) (born 1968), Soviet Russian long jumper